William Wyatt (1804 – 10 June 1886) was an early settler and philanthropist in South Australia. He was the third interim Protector of Aborigines in the colony between 1837 and 1839, worked on documenting the Kaurna language of the local Australian Aboriginal inhabitants of Adelaide and was a member of many boards, involved with fields as diverse as education, medicine and horticulture.

Early life
Wyatt was born in Plymouth, Devon, England, the son of Richard Wyatt. He was educated Shrewsbury School and apprenticed at 16 years of age to a Plymouth surgeon, Thomas Stewart. Wyatt continued to study medicine and obtained the qualification of M.R.C.S. in February 1828. For some time he was honorary surgeon to the Plymouth dispensary and was curator of the museum of the Literary and Scientific Institution.

Early life
Wyatt was born in 1804. He obtained the qualification of M.R.C.S. (Membership of the Royal Colleges of Surgeons of Great Britain and Ireland) in February 1828. He was honorary surgeon to the Plymouth dispensary for some time before leaving England.

Career in Australia
Wyatt emigrated to South Australia as surgeon of the ship John Renwick. He arrived at Adelaide 14 February 1837, and practised there for a short time, in August being appointed city coroner. He served as the third interim part-time Protector of Aborigines from 1837 until 1839, replacing Captain Walter Bromley, who had been dismissed after being criticised by The Register and was afterwards found drowned in the River Torrens.

"Unlike his successor and the German Missionaries, Wyatt did not live at Piltawodli. According to Foster (1990b: 39) he was "criticised for not 'going among' the Aborigines and for failing to provide information to the public about their culture." Nonetheless, Wyatt does provide valuable, though sometimes unreliable, information on the language of the Kaurna people. After the German mission sources, it remains the next most important source and includes a sizable number of terms not recorded elsewhere.

A manuscript copy of Wyatt's wordlist, Vocabulary of the Adelaide Dialect (Wyatt, 1840)14 in the Library of Sir George Grey in the South African Public Library, Cape Town, contains only 67 words, though this is unlikely to represent the extent of Wyatt's knowledge of Kaurna at that time. A more comprehensive paper published later lists approximately 900 Kaurna and Ramindjeri words. The cover page notes that the material was "principally extracted from his official reports" most of which would have been written when Wyatt served as Protector from 1837 to 1839. Assuming Wyatt's (1840) wordlist in the Grey collection is complete, presumably Wyatt went through his papers and extracted words he had recorded in the early days of the colony. The University of Adelaide Library copy, donated by the author, contains three corrections in Wyatt's own hand, where n has been typed instead of u. This wordlist was also published in J. D. Woods ed. (1879) without correction of the three typographical errors. Wyatt identifies certain vocabulary items with a subscript e or r as Encounter Bay or Rapid Bay words respectively. In 1923, Parkhouse republished Wyatt's paper in three separate wordlists designating them 'Adelaide', 'Encounter Bay', and 'Rapid Bay' with changed spellings, substituting u for Wyatt's oo."

In May 1838 he was on the committee of the South Australian School Society, and was also on various other committees. On 28 February 1843 he was chairman of a meeting called to discuss the best means of civilising the Aboriginal Australians, in 1847 he was appointed coroner for the Province of South Australia, and in 1849 he was a member of the provisional committee of the South Australian Colonial Railway Company, one of three public companies contending to build a railway between Adelaide and Port Adelaide; the others being the South Australian Railway Company and Adelaide City and Port Railway Company.

Wyatt was appointed Inspector of Schools for South Australia in 1851 (retiring in 1874) and for the remainder of his life was in every movement that touched the educational or welfare of the colony. He was a governor of the Collegiate School of St Peter, one of the original governors of the State Library of South Australia, a founder and vice-president of the Acclimatization Society, on the board of the Adelaide Botanic Garden, and was chairman of the Adelaide Hospital 1870–1886. He was a member of the Agricultural and Horticultural Society and its president from 1849 to 1850. He was also secretary of the medical board for over 40 years.

Later life, death and legacy
After retiring, Wyatt published Monograph of Certain Crustacea Entomostraca (1883), and he contributed the chapter on the Adelaide and Encounter Bay Aboriginal peoples to the volume on the Native Tribes of South Australia (1879), by J. D. Woods and others.

In his final years though growing infirm, Wyatt still attended to his many duties, and passed some hospital accounts for payment just a week before his death in his eighty-second year on 10 June 1886.

Wyatt had bought some town lots at the first land sale held at Adelaide on 27 May 1837, which laid the foundation of a considerable fortune. He performed many acts of philanthropy in a quiet way and showed much interest in the social life of Adelaide, but never entered politics. He was married and left a widow, his only child to have survived past infancy was murdered by a drunken workman.

Wyatt Trust
The Wyatt Benevolent Institution, now known as the Wyatt Trust, was created by a Wyatt as a trust 1886, to help South Australian individuals struggling with adversity and poverty. It is governed by the  Wyatt Benevolent Institution Incorporation Act 1935, and provides grants to a number of organisations, such as the South Australian Health and Medical Research Institute (SAHMRI), as well as individuals in the form of one-off grants. It supports the Aboriginal Legal Rights Movement, an Aboriginal and Torres Strait Islander Legal Service for Aboriginal South Australians.

References

1804 births
1886 deaths
Settlers of South Australia
English emigrants to colonial Australia
19th-century Australian public servants
19th-century Australian philanthropists